Evilenko is a 2004 English-language Italian crime horror thriller film very loosely based on the Soviet serial killer Andrei Chikatilo. Written and directed by David Grieco, the film stars Malcolm McDowell, Marton Csokas, and Ronald Pickup.

Plot
In 1984, in Kyiv, schoolteacher Andrej Romanovich Evilenko is dismissed from his position after attempting to rape a pupil. Driven by his psychopathic urges and embittered by the collapse of the Soviet Union, Evilenko begins to rape, kill, and cannibalise women and children. It is hinted throughout the movie that Evilenko somehow gained the power to hypnotise his victims, which accounts for their lack of resistance and his continuous evasion of the authorities.

Vadim Timurouvic Lesiev, a magistrate and family man, is assigned to catch the serial killer. For years, Evilenko eludes Lesiev and psychiatrist Aron Richter, who is assigned to profile the killer. Richter eventually finds Evilenko with a little girl and manages to break Evilenko's hypnotic hold on her, but is killed by Evilenko in retaliation; although it appears to Evilenko that she is run over by a train, the girl escapes alive.

Almost two years later, Lesiev finally captures Evilenko, who by now has killed 55 people, mostly children and young women. On 22 May 1992, Evilenko goes to court, and on 14 February 1994, he is finally executed. Before his execution, two governments expressed interest in Evilenko's psychic abilities and asked for extradition of Evilenko but were denied.

Cast
 Malcolm McDowell as Andrei Romanovich Evilenko
 Marton Csokas as Vadim Timurovich Lesiev
 Ronald Pickup as Aron Richter
 Frances Barber as Fenya Evilenka
 John Benfield as Oleg Chivadze
 Alexei Chadyuk as Captain Ramensky
 Ostap Stupka as Doctor Amitrin
 Vernon Dobtcheff as Bagdasarov
 Adrian McCourt as Surinov
 Ruby Kammer as Tonya

Production
The story is a fictionalization of the life and crimes of serial killer Andrei Chikatilo. Large segments of the film were adapted from Grieco's novel entitled The Communist Who Ate Children. The character is renamed Andrei Evilenko in reference to Chikatilo.

Soundtrack
The soundtrack was composed by Angelo Badalamenti and features two tracks with Dolores O'Riordan, "Angels Go to Heaven" and "No Way Out". It has been released in 2004 on CD digipak by Italian music label Minus Habens Records.

See also
 Andrei Chikatilo
 Citizen X

References

External links
 

2004 films
2004 horror films
2004 crime thriller films
2000s horror thriller films
Italian crime thriller films
Italian horror thriller films
Crime horror films
2000s serial killer films
English-language Italian films
Films about pedophilia
Horror films based on actual events
Films based on non-fiction books
Films set in the 1980s
Films set in the 1990s
Films set in Russia
Films set in Ukraine
Films shot in Ukraine
Italian independent films
Italian serial killer films
Crime films based on actual events
Films scored by Angelo Badalamenti
2004 independent films
2000s English-language films